Tethya rubra is a species of sea sponge belonging to the family Tethyidae. It is found in the Atlantic Ocean off the coast of Brazil.

References 

Animals described in 2011